High Blue Wall is a 1974 Czechoslovak action drama film directed by Vladimír Čech. It is inspired by Air battle over Merklín. It is first Czech film that used 70 mm technology. The film is sometimes called 1970s Czech Top Gun. it wasn't very successful with audiences and gained negative reception.

Cast
 Martin Růžek as General Dvořák
 Jiří Bednář as Capt. Jelínek
 Jiří Němeček as Colonel Šmíd
 Josef Langmiler as Major Josef Švestka
 Josef Chvalina as Major Pekař
 Gustav Heverle as Major Pecka
 Vanda Švarcová as Secretary Libuška
 Jiří Krampol as Lieutenant Zdeněk Netopil
 Ladislav Trojan as Lieutenant Vašíček

References

External links
 

1974 films
1974 drama films
Czech action drama films
Films about the Czechoslovak Army
1970s Czech films
Czech aviation films